The Last Samurai is a 2003 epic period action drama film directed and co-produced by Edward Zwick, who also co-wrote the screenplay with John Logan and Marshall Herskovitz from a story devised by Logan. The film stars Ken Watanabe in the title role, with Tom Cruise, who also co-produced, as a soldier-turned-samurai who befriends him, and Timothy Spall, Billy Connolly, Tony Goldwyn, Hiroyuki Sanada, Koyuki, and Shin Koyamada in supporting roles.

Tom Cruise portrays Nathan Algren, an American captain of the 7th Cavalry Regiment, whose personal and emotional conflicts bring him into contact with samurai warriors in the wake of the Meiji Restoration in 19th century Japan. The film's plot was inspired by the 1877 Satsuma Rebellion led by Saigō Takamori and the Westernization of Japan by foreign powers. The character of Algren was influenced by Jules Brunet, a French Imperial Guard officer who fought alongside Enomoto Takeaki in the earlier Boshin War; Ernest Mason Satow and Algernon Mitford, British diplomats during the Meiji restoration who were involved in the Satsuma rebellion; and, to a lesser extent, by Frederick Townsend Ward, an American mercenary who helped Westernize the Chinese army.

The Last Samurai grossed a total of $456 million at the box office and received positive reviews, with praise for the acting, visuals and Zimmer's score but criticism for some of its portrayals. It was nominated for several awards, including four Academy Awards, three Golden Globe Awards, and two National Board of Review Awards.

Plot 

In 1876, former U.S. Army Captain Nathan Algren, a skilled soldier who has become a bitter alcoholic traumatized by the atrocities he committed during the American Indian Wars, is approached by his former commanding officer Colonel Bagley. Bagley asks him to train the newly created Imperial Japanese Army for a Japanese businessman, Omura, who intends to use the army to suppress a Samurai-headed rebellion against Japan's new emperor. Despite his hatred of Bagley, the impoverished Algren takes the job for the money. He is accompanied to Japan by his old friend, Sergeant Zebulon Gant. Upon arriving, Algren meets Simon Graham, a British translator knowledgeable about the samurai.

Algren learns that the Imperial soldiers are simply conscripted peasants with shoddy training and little discipline. While training them to shoot, Algren is informed that the samurai are attacking one of Omura's railroads; Omura sends the army there, despite Algren's protests that they are not ready. The battle is a disaster, as the undisciplined conscripts are routed, and Gant is killed. Algren fights to the last before he is surrounded; expecting to die, he is taken prisoner when samurai leader Katsumoto decides to spare him; General Hasegawa, a former Samurai serving in the Imperial Army, commits seppuku rather than be taken prisoner. Algren is taken to Katsumoto's village. While he is poorly treated at first, he eventually gains the samurai's respect and grows close to Katsumoto. Algren overcomes his alcoholism and guilt, learns the Japanese language and culture, and is trained in the art of kenjutsu. He develops sympathy for the samurai, who are upset that the pace of modern technology has eroded the traditions of their society. Algren and Taka, Katsumoto's sister and the widow of a samurai killed by Algren, develop an unspoken affection for each other.

One night, a group of ninja infiltrate the village and attempt to assassinate Katsumoto. Algren saves Katsumoto's life, and then helps defend the village, concluding that Omura must have hired the ninjas. Katsumoto requests a meeting with Emperor Meiji in Tokyo. He brings Algren, intending to release him. Upon arriving in Tokyo, Algren sees that the Imperial Army has become a well-trained and fully equipped force led by Bagley. Katsumoto, to his dismay, discovers that the young and inexperienced Emperor has become a puppet of Omura. At a government meeting, Omura orders Katsumoto's arrest for carrying a sword in public and tells him to perform seppuku the next day to redeem his honour. Meanwhile, Algren refuses Bagley's offer to resume command of the army, prompting Omura to send assassins after him, but Algren kills the assailants and then assists the samurai in freeing Katsumoto. During the rescue, Katsumoto's son Nobutada is mortally wounded, his sacrifice allowing the others to escape.

As the Imperial Army marches to crush the rebellion, a grieving Katsumoto contemplates seppuku. Algren convinces him to fight and joins the samurai in battle. The samurai use the Imperial Army's overconfidence to lure them into a trap; the ensuing battle inflicts massive casualties on both sides and forces the Imperial soldiers to retreat. Knowing that Imperial reinforcements are coming, and defeat is inevitable, Katsumoto orders a suicidal cavalry charge on horseback. The samurai withstand an artillery barrage and break through Bagley's line. Algren kills Bagley, but the samurai are quickly mowed down by Gatling guns. The Imperial captain, previously trained by Algren and horrified by the sight of the dying samurai, orders the soldiers to cease fire, outraging Omura. Katsumoto, mortally wounded, commits seppuku with Algren's help as the soldiers kneel in respect.

Later, as trade negotiations conclude, the injured Algren interrupts the proceedings. He presents the Emperor with Katsumoto's sword and asks him to remember the traditions for which Katsumoto and his fellow Samurai fought and died. The Emperor realizes that while Japan should modernize, it cannot forget its own culture and history. He rejects the trade offer, and when Omura protests, the Emperor threatens to seize Omura's assets and distribute them among the populace. Omura claims to be disgraced, and the Emperor offers him Katsumoto's sword, saying that if the shame is too great, Omura should commit seppuku. Omura relents and leaves.

While various rumours regarding Algren's fate circulate, Graham concludes that Algren had returned to the village to reunite with Taka.

Cast
Tom Cruise as Captain Nathan Algren, a Civil War and Indian War veteran haunted by his role in the massacre of Native Americans at the Sand Creek or Chivington and/or the massacre of Native Americans at the Washita River. Following his discharge from the United States Army, he agrees to help the new Meiji Restoration government train its first Western-style conscript army for a significant sum of money. During the army's first battle he is captured by the samurai Katsumoto and taken to the village of Katsumoto's son, where he soon becomes intrigued with the way of the samurai and decides to join them in their cause. His journal entries reveal his impressions about traditional Japanese culture, which almost immediately evolve into unrestrained admiration of Japan. 
Ken Watanabe as Lord Moritsugu Katsumoto, the eponymous "Last Samurai," a former daimyo who was once Emperor Meiji's most trusted teacher. His displeasure with the influence of Omura and other Western reformers on the Emperor lead him to organize his fellow samurai in a revolt, which he hopes will convince the government not to destroy the samurai's place in Japanese society. Katsumoto is based on real-life samurai Saigō Takamori, who led the Satsuma Rebellion.
Koyuki Kato as Taka, widow of a samurai slain by Nathan Algren and younger sister of Lord Katsumoto. She and Algren develop feelings for each other, and she gives him her husband's armor to wear in the final battle of the rebellion.
Timothy Spall as Simon Graham, a British photographer and scholar hired as an interpreter for Captain Algren and his non-English speaking soldiers. Initially portrayed as a friendly yet mission-oriented and practical-minded companion, he later comes to sympathize with the samurai cause and helps Algren rescue Katsumoto from Imperial soldiers. Graham is loosely based on real-life British Japanologist Ernest Mason Satow, who befriended Saigō Takamori during the Satsuma rebellion.
Shin Koyamada as Nobutada Katsumoto, Katsumoto's son who is responsible for the village where Algren is sent. Nobutada befriends Algren when Katsumoto assigns him to teach Algren Japanese culture and the Japanese language. He dies when he willingly chooses to distract Imperial troops so his father can escape their custody.
Tony Goldwyn as Colonel Bagley, Nathan Algren's former commanding officer in the 7th Cavalry Regiment, who hires him to serve as a training instructor for the Imperial Army despite Algren's hatred of Bagley for his role in the Washita River massacre. In contrast to Algren, Bagley is arrogant and dismissive of the samurai, at one point referring to them nothing more than "savages with bows and arrows". He is killed by Algren who throws a sword into his chest when Bagley tries to shoot Katsumoto in the final battle.
Masato Harada as Matsue Omura, an industrialist and pro-reform politician. He quickly imports Westernization and modernization while making money for himself through his ownership of Japan's railroads. Coming from a merchant family, a social class repressed during the days of Shogun rule, Omura openly expresses his contempt for the samurai and takes advantage of Emperor Meiji's youth to become his chief advisor, persuading him to form a Western-style army for the sole purpose of wiping out Katsumoto and his rebels while ignoring their grievances. His appearance is designed to evoke the image of Okubo Toshimichi, a leading reformer during the Meiji Restoration. Harada noted that he was deeply interested in joining the film after witnessing the construction of Emperor Meiji's conference room on sound stage 19 (where Humphrey Bogart had once acted) at Warner Brothers studios.
Shichinosuke Nakamura as Emperor Meiji. Credited with the implementation of the Meiji reforms to Japanese society, the Emperor is eager to import Western ideas and practices to modernize and empower Japan to become a strong nation. However, his inexperience causes him to rely heavily on the advice of men like Omura, who have their own agendas. His appearance bears a strong resemblance to Emperor Meiji during the 1860s (when his authority as Emperor was not yet firmly established) rather than during the 1870s, when the film takes place.
Hiroyuki Sanada as Ujio, a master swordsman and one of Katsumoto's most trusted followers. He teaches Algren the art of sword fighting, coming to respect him as an equal. He is one of the last samurai to die in the final battle, being gunned down during Katsumoto's charge.
Seizo Fukumoto as Silent Samurai, an elderly samurai tasked with monitoring Algren during his time in the village, who calls the samurai "Bob". "Bob" ultimately saves Algren's life (and speaking for the first and only time, "Algren-san!") by taking a bullet meant for him in the final battle.
Billy Connolly as Sergeant Zebulon Gant, an Irish American Civil War veteran who served with and is loyal to Algren, persuading him to come to Japan and working with him to train the Imperial Army. During the first battle, he is killed by Hirotaro (Taka's husband) after being wounded with a spear.
Shun Sugata as Nakao, a tall samurai who wields a naginata and is skilled in jujutsu. He assists Algren in rescuing Katsumoto and dies along with the other samurai in the final battle.
 Togo Igawa as General Hasegawa, a former Samurai serving in the Imperial Japanese Army. He commits seppuku after the first battle.

Production 

Filming took place in New Zealand, mostly in the Taranaki region, with mostly Japanese cast members and an American production crew. This location was chosen due to the fact that Egmont/Mount Taranaki resembles Mount Fuji, and also because there is a lot of forest and farmland in the Taranaki region. American Location Manager Charlie Harrington saw the mountain in a travel book and encouraged the producers to send him to Taranaki to scout the locations. This acted as a backdrop for many scenes, as opposed to the built up cities of Japan. Several of the village scenes were shot on the Warner Bros. Studios backlot in Burbank, California. Some scenes were shot in Kyoto and Himeji, Japan. There were 13 filming locations altogether. Tom Cruise did his own stunts for the film.

The film is based on an original screenplay entitled "The Last Samurai", from a story by John Logan. The project itself was inspired by writer and director Vincent Ward. Ward became executive producer on the film – working in development on it for nearly four years and after approaching several directors (Francis Ford Coppola, Peter Weir), until he became interested with Edward Zwick. The film production went ahead with Zwick and was shot in Ward's native New Zealand.

The film was based on the stories of Jules Brunet, a French Imperial Guard sub-lieutenant who fought alongside Enomoto Takeaki in the earlier Boshin War; Philip Kearny, a United States Army (Union Army) and French Imperial Guard soldier, notable for his leadership in the American Civil War, who fought against the Tututni tribe in the Rogue River Wars in Oregon; and Frederick Townsend Ward, an American mercenary who helped Westernize the Qing army by forming the Ever Victorious Army. The historical roles of other European nations who were involved in the westernization of Japan are largely attributed to the United States in the film, although the film references European involvement as well.

Music 

The Last Samurai: Original Motion Picture Score was released on November 25, 2003, by Warner Sunset Records. All music on the soundtrack was composed, arranged, and produced by Hans Zimmer, performed by the Hollywood Studio Symphony, and conducted by Blake Neely. It peaked at number 24 on the US Top Soundtracks chart.

Reception

Critical response 
The film achieved higher box office receipts in Japan than in the United States. Critical reception in Japan was generally positive. Tomomi Katsuta of The Mainichi Shinbun thought that the film was "a vast improvement over previous American attempts to portray Japan", noting that director Edward Zwick "had researched Japanese history, cast well-known Japanese actors and consulted dialogue coaches to make sure he didn't confuse the casual and formal categories of Japanese speech." Katsuta still found fault with the film's idealistic, "storybook" portrayal of the samurai, stating: "Our image of samurai is that they were more corrupt." As such, he said, the noble samurai leader Katsumoto "set my teeth on edge."

In the United States, review aggregator Rotten Tomatoes reports that 66% of critics have given the film a positive review based on 223 reviews, with an average score of 6.40/10. The site's consensus states: "With high production values and thrilling battle scenes, The Last Samurai is a satisfying epic." At Metacritic, which assigns a weighted mean rating out of 100 to reviews from mainstream critics, the film received an average score of 55, based on reviews from 43 critics, indicating "mixed or average reviews".

Roger Ebert of Chicago Sun-Times gave the film three and a half stars out of four, saying "beautifully designed, intelligently written, acted with conviction, it's an uncommonly thoughtful epic." 

One online analyst compares the movie favorably to Dances with Wolves in that each protagonist meets and combats a "technologically backward people". Both Costner's and Cruise's characters have suffered through a series of traumatic and brutal battles. Each ultimately uses his experiences to later assist his new friends. Each comes to respect his newly adopted culture. Each even fights with his new community against the people and traditions from which he came.

Box office 
As of January 1, 2016, the film had grossed $456.8 million against a production budget of $140 million. It grossed $111,127,263 in the United States and Canada, and $345,631,718 in other countries. It was one of the most successful box office hits in Japan, where it grossed .,

Accolades

Criticism and debate 

Motoko Rich of The New York Times observed that the film has opened up a debate, "particularly among Asian-Americans and Japanese," about whether the film and others like it were "racist, naïve, well-intentioned, accurate – or all of the above."

Todd McCarthy, a film critic for the Variety magazine, wrote: "Clearly enamored of the culture it examines while resolutely remaining an outsider's romanticization of it, yarn is disappointingly content to recycle familiar attitudes about the nobility of ancient cultures, Western despoilment of them, liberal historical guilt, the unrestrainable greed of capitalists and the irreducible primacy of Hollywood movie stars."

According to the history professor Cathy Schultz, "Many samurai fought Meiji modernization not for altruistic reasons but because it challenged their status as the privileged warrior caste. Meiji reformers proposed the radical idea that all men essentially being equal.... The film also misses the historical reality that many Meiji policy advisors were former samurai, who had voluntarily given up their traditional privileges to follow a course they believed would strengthen Japan."

The fictional character of Katsumoto bears a striking resemblance to the historical figure of Saigō Takamori, a hero of the Meiji Restoration and the leader of the ineffective Satsuma Rebellion, who appears in the histories and legends of modern Japan as a hero against the corruption, extravagance, and unprincipled politics of his contemporaries. "Though he had agreed to become a member of the new government," wrote the translator and historian Ivan Morris, "it was clear from his writings and statements that he believed the ideals of the civil war were being vitiated. He was opposed to the excessively rapid changes in Japanese society and was particularly disturbed by the shabby treatment of the warrior class." Suspicious of the new bureaucracy, he wanted power to remain in the hands of the samurai class and the Emperor, and for those reasons, he had joined the central government. "Edicts like the interdiction against carrying swords and wearing the traditional topknot seemed like a series of gratuitous provocations; and, though Saigō realized that Japan needed an effective standing army to resist pressure from the West, he could not countenance the social implications of the military reforms. For this reason Saigō, although participating in the Okinoerabu government, continued to exercise a powerful appeal among disgruntled ex-samurai in Satsuma and elsewhere." Saigō fought for a moral revolution, not a material one, and he described his revolt as a check on the declining morality of a new, Westernizing materialism.

In 2014, the movie was one of several discussed by Keli Goff in The Daily Beast in an article on white savior narratives in film, a cinematic trope studied in sociology, for which The Last Samurai has been analyzed. David Sirota at Salon saw the film as "yet another film presenting the white Union army official as personally embodying the North's Civil War effort to liberate people of color" and criticizing the release poster as "a not-so-subtle message encouraging audiences to (wrongly) perceive the white guy -- and not a Japanese person -- as the last great leader of the ancient Japanese culture." 

In a 2022 interview with The Guardian, Ken Watanabe stated that he didn't think of The Last Samurai as a white savior narrative and that it was a turning point for Asian representation in Hollywood. Watanabe also stated, “Before The Last Samurai, there was this stereotype of Asian people with glasses, bucked teeth and a camera,” [...] It was stupid, but after The Last Samurai came out, Hollywood tried to be more authentic when it came to Asian stories.”

See also 

 Foreign government advisors in Meiji Japan
 Ōmura Masujirō
 French Military Mission to Japan (1867)
 Mark Rappaport (creature effects artist)

Explanatory notes

References

Further reading 
  - Bachelor of Education thesis - Written in English with an abstract in Indonesian

External links 

 
 
 
 
 
 
 Does The Last Samurai have the saddest movie death? at AMCTV.com

2003 films
2003 multilingual films
2000s action drama films
2000s adventure drama films
2000s English-language films
2000s Japanese-language films
2003 drama films
Adventure films based on actual events
American action drama films
American adventure drama films
American epic films
American historical action films
American multilingual films
Cruise/Wagner Productions films
Empire of Japan
Films à clef
Films directed by Edward Zwick
Films scored by Hans Zimmer
Films produced by Scott Kroopf
Films produced by Tom Cruise
Films with screenplays by John Logan
Films set in 1877
Films set in California
Films set in Japan
Films set in Kyoto
Films set in the Meiji period
Films shot in New Zealand
Films shot in Kyoto
Films shot in Himeji
Japan in non-Japanese culture
Japanese action drama films
Japanese adventure drama films
Japanese epic films
Japanese historical films
Japanese multilingual films
Meiji period in fiction
New Zealand action films
New Zealand adventure films
New Zealand drama films
New Zealand epic films
New Zealand historical films
New Zealand multilingual films
Ninja films
Samurai films
Warner Bros. films
2000s American films